Green Lake County is a county located in the U.S. state of Wisconsin. As of the 2020 census, the population was 19,018. Its county seat is Green Lake. In 2020, the center of population of Wisconsin was located in Green Lake County, near the city of Markesan.

Geography

It is the third-smallest county in Wisconsin by total area.

Major highways
  Highway 23 (Wisconsin)
  Highway 44 (Wisconsin)
  Highway 49 (Wisconsin)
  Highway 73 (Wisconsin)
  Highway 91 (Wisconsin)

Railroads
Union Pacific
Wisconsin and Southern Railroad

Buses
List of intercity bus stops in Wisconsin

Adjacent counties
 Waushara County – north
 Winnebago County – northeast
 Fond du Lac County – east
 Dodge County – southeast
 Columbia County – southwest
 Marquette County – west

Demographics

2020 census
As of the census of 2020, the population was 19,018. The racial makeup of the county was 92.0% White, 0.6% Black or African American, 0.5% Asian, 0.4% Native American, 0.1% Pacific Islander, 2.1% from other races, and 4.2% from two or more races. Ethnically, the population was 5.1% Hispanic or Latino of any race.

2000 census

As of the census of 2000, there were 19,105 people, 7,703 households, and 5,322 families residing in the county.  The population density was 54 people per square mile (21/km2).  There were 9,831 housing units at an average density of 28 per square mile (11/km2).  The racial makeup of the county was 97.81% White, 0.15% Black or African American, 0.20% Native American, 0.31% Asian, 0.04% Pacific Islander, 0.89% from other races, and 0.60% from two or more races.  2.06% of the population were Hispanic or Latino of any race. 51.8% were of German, 10.6% Polish, 5.8% Irish and 5.8% American ancestry. 94.2% spoke English, 3.0% Spanish and 1.8% German as their first language.

There were 7,703 households, out of which 29.40% had children under the age of 18 living with them, 58.50% were married couples living together, 6.90% had a female householder with no husband present, and 30.90% were non-families. 27.00% of all households were made up of individuals, and 13.80% had someone living alone who was 65 years of age or older.  The average household size was 2.43 and the average family size was 2.96.

In the county, the population was spread out, with 24.20% under the age of 18, 6.60% from 18 to 24, 26.20% from 25 to 44, 24.20% from 45 to 64, and 18.80% who were 65 years of age or older.  The median age was 41 years. For every 100 females there were 97.00 males.  For every 100 females age 18 and over, there were 95.20 males.

Birth statistics

In 2017, there were 380 births, giving a general fertility rate of 61.6 births per 1000 women aged 15–44, the 32nd lowest rate out of all 72 Wisconsin counties. Of these, 77 of the births occurred at home, the fourth highest for Wisconsin counties. Additionally, there were 11 reported induced abortions performed on women of Green Lake County residence in 2017.

Religious membership

In 2010, the largest religious groups by number of adherents were Catholic at 5,290 adherents, Wisconsin Synod Lutheran at 2,498 adherents, Missouri Synod Lutheran at 1,173 adherents, ELCA Lutheran at 964 adherents, and Amish at 812 adherents.

Communities

Cities
 Berlin (partly in Waushara County)
 Green Lake (county seat)
 Markesan
 Princeton

Villages
 Kingston
 Marquette

Towns

 Berlin
 Brooklyn
 Green Lake
 Kingston
 Mackford
 Manchester
 Marquette
 Princeton
 Seneca
 St. Marie

Census-designated place
 Dalton

Unincorporated communities

 Fairburn
 Forest Glen Beach
 Green Lake Terrace
 Greenwyck
 Indian Hills
 Manchester
 Pleasant Point
 Sandstone Bluff
 Sherwood Forest
 Spring Grove
 Tuleta Hills
 Utley

Politics

See also
 National Register of Historic Places listings in Green Lake County, Wisconsin

References

Further reading
 Portrait and Biographical Album of Green Lake, Marquette and Waushara Counties, Wisconsin. Chicago: Acme Publishing, 1890.

External links
 Green Lake County government website
 Green Lake County map from the Wisconsin Department of Transportation

 
1858 establishments in Wisconsin
Populated places established in 1858